Tom Daley Goes Global (previously titled Tom Daley Takes on the World) is a British television documentary show shown on ITV2 which began airing on 10 April 2014.
The show follows Olympic bronze medal winner Tom Daley and his best friend Sophie Lee backpack around the world for six weeks to get life-changing experiences, whilst in each country Daley will try some extreme sports such as bungee jumping and flying a jet-plane to raise money for a brain tumour charity.

Episodes

Reception
Catriona Wightman of Digital Spy described the show as not particularly enjoyable and having little depth, writing that "it all feels like a home movie" which "doesn't necessarily make for compelling television". Rhik Samadder of The Guardian called it "duller than the back of a scuffed spoon", arguing that the "sight of vague celebrities going on holiday does not make great television".

References

External links
 Official website

2014 British television series debuts
2014 British television series endings
English-language television shows